The Kedumba River, a perennial river that is part of the Hawkesbury-Nepean catchment, is located in the Blue Mountains and Macarthur regions of New South Wales, Australia.

Course and features
The Kedumba Creek rises on the eastern side of Walford Park, Katoomba and flows generally south over the Katoomba Cascades, Katoomba Falls, and off the Blue Mountains Range, becoming the Kedumba River below the Three Sisters flowing through the Jamison and Kedumba valleys within the Blue Mountains National Park, before reaching its confluence with the Coxs River within Lake Burragorang. The river descends  over its  course.

See also 

 Gandangara people
 List of rivers of Australia
 List of rivers of New South Wales (A–K)
 Rivers of New South Wales

References 

 

Rivers of New South Wales
Rivers of the Blue Mountains (New South Wales)